Simeoni is an Italian surname or Corsican. Notable people with the surname include:

Edmond Simeoni (1934-2018), Corsican political activist and nationalist ;
Filippo Simeoni (born 1971), Italian cyclist
Gilles Simeoni (1967-), Corsican politician, son of Edmond Simeoni and nephew of Max ;
Giovanni Simeoni (1816–1892), Italian Roman Catholic archbishop and cardinal
Luca Simeoni (born 1990), Italian footballer
Max Simeoni (born 1929), Corsican physician and politician
Roldano Simeoni (born 1948), Italian water polo player
Sara Simeoni (born 1953), Italian high jumper

See also
 Simeone

Surnames of South Tyrolean origin
Italian-language surnames